Francisco Layna Serrano (27 June 1893, in Luzón (Guadalajara) –  7 May 1971, in Madrid) was a Spanish medical doctor and historian of Guadalajara Province. His first work was on Santa Maria de Ovila, 1922.

Works
 La arquitectura románica en la provincia de Guadalajara

References

1893 births
1971 deaths
People from the Province of Guadalajara
20th-century Spanish historians